Douglas John Gurr (born July 1964) is a British businessman, and the Director of the Natural History Museum, London. He was a global vice-president and head of Amazon UK from 2016 to 2020. He is chairman of the British Heart Foundation. He formerly taught at Aarhus University and held positions in the United Kingdom civil service, at McKinsey & Co, and at Asda.

Early life and education
Gurr was born in Leeds, England, in July 1964, to parents from New Zealand, and his father was head of the English department at the University of Nairobi. He was educated at the University of Cambridge where he studied the Mathematical Tripos and the University of Edinburgh where he was awarded a PhD in 1990 for research on semantic frameworks using monads supervised by Gordon Plotkin.

Career
Gurr began his career as an academic teaching maths and computing at the Aarhus University in Denmark, before working for the United Kingdom's Civil Service.

Gurr then worked for McKinsey & Co, for six years, where he became a partner. He then founded Blueheath, an internet-enabled stockless wholesaler, which was later sold to Booker Group.

He was then a main board director of Asda.  He joined Amazon in 2011, and was China country manager from 2014 to 2016, before becoming UK country manager in 2016, succeeding Chris North who left to become CEO of Shutterfly.

Gurr has been the chairman of the British Heart Foundation since 2015, and a non-executive director of the UK government's Department for Work and Pensions. He is also a trustee of the Landmark Trust.

In July 2018, Gurr received widespread attention for his claim that a no-deal Brexit could lead to civil unrest "within two weeks".

Gurr was appointed as Director of the Natural History Museum, London in 2020.

As of 2021, he is a Non-Executive Director of the Department of Health and Social Care, with 'responsibility for the union'. 

From 1st July 2022, Gurr was appointed the new Chair of the Board of Trustees of The Alan Turing Institute, the UK's national institute for data science and artificial intelligence.

Personal life
Gurr is married, with two children, and lives in London and Yorkshire. He is a former Scottish international triathlete, and a keen ski mountaineer.

References

Living people
Alumni of the University of Cambridge
Alumni of the University of Edinburgh
Walmart people
McKinsey & Company people
Businesspeople from Leeds
Amazon (company) people
Academic staff of Aarhus University
British people of New Zealand descent
British male triathletes
1964 births
British civil servants
Directors of the Natural History Museum, London